Velimir Stojnić (Serbian Cyrillic: Велимир Стојнић; born 29 October 1962) is a Bosnian professional football manager and former player.

Managerial career
Stojnić took up the hot seat of Rudar Prijedor in March 2012 after Dragan Radović was sacked. He succeeded Zoran Marić as manager of Krupa in September 2020.

Honours

Player
Borac Banja Luka
Yugoslav Cup: 1987–88
Republika Srpska Cup: 1994–95, 1995–96
Mitropa Cup: 1992

References

External links

1962 births
Living people
Sportspeople from Banja Luka
Serbs of Bosnia and Herzegovina
Association football defenders
Association football midfielders
Yugoslav footballers
Bosnia and Herzegovina footballers
FK Borac Banja Luka players
Yugoslav First League players
Yugoslav Second League players
Premier League of Bosnia and Herzegovina players
Bosnia and Herzegovina football managers
FK Modriča managers
FK Borac Banja Luka managers
FK Rudar Prijedor managers
FK Kozara Gradiška managers
FK Krupa managers
Premier League of Bosnia and Herzegovina managers